False Pass is a city on Unimak Island, in the Aleutians East Borough of southwestern Alaska, United States. Although the population was marked 397 including seasonal fish processing plant workers at the 2020 census, approximately 35 residents call it home year-round.

History
False Pass is an early English name for Isanotski Strait on which the city of False Pass is located. The strait was called "False Pass" by early American sailing ship captains because it was thought to be impassable for their deep draft vessels at the northern end.  A salmon cannery was built on the Unimak Island side of the strait in 1919  which provided the nucleus for the modern settlement. A U.S. post office with the name of False Pass was established in 1921 which gave official status to the community.

Commercial fishing for salmon, cod, halibut and crab continues to be the core of the community's lifestyle and economy.

Geography
False Pass is at  (54.827886, -163.399090). It is near the eastern end of Unimak Island, in the Aleutian Islands chain. Part of the city (26.093 km2, or 10.075 sq mi) is on the mainland's westernmost tip Alaska Peninsula, across the Isanotski Strait (about 600 meters at the closest point), although that section is nearly unpopulated. The city boundaries include the abandoned villages of Morzhovoi and Ikatan.

Transportation
Boats and aircraft are the only transportation to and from False Pass. Aircraft use False Pass Airport.

Demographics

False Pass first appeared on the 1930 U.S. Census as the unincorporated area of "Unimak." This included the populations of both False Pass and Ikatan. It reported again in 1940, but in 1950, was returned separately as False Pass (as an unincorporated village). It was made a census-designated place in 1980.

2000 Census
As of the census of 2000, there were 64 people, 22 households, and 13 families residing in the city. The population density was 2.4 people per square mile (0.9/km2). There were 40 housing units at an average density of 1.5 per square mile (0.6/km2). The racial makeup of the city was 62.50% Native American, 26.56% White, 1.56% from other races, and 9.38% from two or more races. 1.56% of the population were Hispanic or Latino of any race.

There were 22 households, out of which 31.8% had children under the age of 18 living with them, 22.7% were married couples living together, 18.2% had a female householder with no husband present, and 36.4% were non-families. 31.8% of all households were made up of individuals, and 9.1% had someone living alone who was 65 years of age or older. The average household size was 2.91 and the average family size was 3.79.

In the city, the age distribution of the population shows 35.9% under the age of 18, 9.4% from 18 to 24, 18.8% from 25 to 44, 31.3% from 45 to 64, and 4.7% who were 65 years of age or older. The median age was 32 years. For every 100 females, there were 100.0 males. For every 100 females age 18 and over, there were 115.8 males.

The median income for a household in the city was $49,375, and the median income for a family was $70,625. Males had a median income of $23,750 versus $37,083 for females. The per capita income for the city was $21,465. There were 11.1% of families and 8.0% of the population living below the poverty line, including no under eighteens and 50.0% of those over 64.

Occupation categories for the 2000 census are shown in the accompanying pie chart.   The community has traditionally depended upon commercial fishing, but it now employs only 24% of the workforce or 10 individuals.  These individuals are boat captains and crewmen.  As in many modern American communities, white collar sales/office and management positions now employ 51% of the employment positions or 21 people.

Education
Aleutians East Borough School District (AEBSD) operates the False Pass School.

Circa 1978 the school, then a part of the Aleutian Region School District, had a single teacher, and 8 students.

Picture gallery

References

External links
 

Cities in Alaska
Cities in Aleutians East Borough, Alaska
Populated coastal places in Alaska on the Pacific Ocean
Unimak Island